The 2014 Coates Hire Ipswich 400 was a motor race meeting for the Australian sedan-based V8 Supercars. It was the eighth event of the 2014 International V8 Supercars Championship. It was held on the weekend of 1–3 August at the Queensland Raceway, near Ipswich, Queensland.

References 

Ipswich
August 2014 sports events in Australia